Vila Verde is a municipality in the district of Braga in Portugal. The population in 2021 was 46,446, in an area of 228.67 km².

Vila Verde's current mayor, as of 26 September 2021, is Júlia Fernandes of the Social Democratic Party. She succeeded António Vilela of the same party. The municipal holiday is 13 June.

The county of Vila Verde has a little over 150 years of existence and is one of the biggest counties in the Minho Province.

Parishes
Administratively, the municipality is divided into 33 civil parishes (freguesias):

 Aboim da Nóbrega e Gondomar
 Atiães
 Cabanelas
 Carreiras (São Miguel e Santiago)
 Cervães
 Coucieiro
 Dossãos
 Escariz (São Mamede e São Martinho)
 Esqueiros, Nevogilde e Travassós
 Freiriz
 Gême
 Lage
 Lanhas
 Loureira
 Marrancos e Arcozelo
 Moure
 Oleiros
 Oriz (Santa Marinha e São Miguel)
 Parada de Gatim
 Pico
 Pico de Regalados, Gondiães e Mós
 Ponte
 Ribeira do Neiva
 Sabariz
 Sande, Vilarinho, Barros e Gomide
 São Miguel do Prado
 Soutelo
 Turiz
 Vade
 Valbom (São Pedro), Passô e Valbom (São Martinho) 
 Valdreu
 Vila de Prado
 Vila Verde e Barbudo

Main sights
Vila Verde and surrounding region have many historical monuments.

Penegate Tower

Gallery

Notable people 
 Augusto Gama (born 1970) a former footballer with 484 club caps and a manager
 Bruno Gama (born 1987) a professional footballer with over 440 club caps

References

External links

Municipality official website

 
Towns in Portugal